Robert Andrew Scallon (born August 26, 1990) is an American YouTuber, musician, and multi-instrumentalist based in Chicago, Illinois. He is best known for several viral videos featuring his music, including heavy metal songs played with traditionally non-metal instruments.

Early life 
Scallon was born on August 26, 1990, and was raised in Arlington Heights, Illinois. As a child, he and his friends would visit their local Guitar Center and play instruments, although would never buy any due to lack of money. He was gifted his first guitar, a nylon-string classical, from his friend's father. He used it to write his first solo songs, and it was featured on many of his early videos.

As a teenager, Scallon played drums in a metal band called Gas Mask Catalogue.

Career
Scallon began uploading to YouTube in February 2007, and began to develop a following in 2008. His popularity launched as he began to cover metal songs with folk and country instruments. Most notable are his renditions of songs on banjo, including "Raining Blood" by Slayer, "Master of Puppets" by Metallica, and "Psychosocial" by Slipknot, the latter featuring a cameo appearance by Corey Taylor. His videos have featured collaborations with Andrew Huang, Boyinaband, Davie504, Doug Walker, Jared Dines, Leo Moracchioli, Mary Spender, and Sarah Longfield.

Scallon has released several solo albums. While most are self-released, his EP Anchor and LP The Scene is Dead are sold through DFTBA Records. His releases have featured instrumentalists such as Jeff Loomis, Rabea Massaad, Ola Englund, and Pete Cottrell. He plays drums in the band Hank Green and the Perfect Strangers, and their debut album Incongruent peaked at number 3 on the Billboard Comedy Albums chart in 2014. He is also part of a collaborative project with Andrew Huang called First of October, a novelty band that records an album within one recording session on October 1.

Scallon released a signature series of guitars with Chapman Guitars in 2017. Three more guitars were added to his line in 2020. In 2022, Scallon ended his partnership with Chapman and launched a new line of guitars with Schecter.

Scallon, in partnership with Sweetwater Sound, received a Guinness World Record for the largest guitar effect pedalboard in 2019. On January 1, 2021, Scallon launched GuitarQuest, a paid online course to teach people how to play guitar. Later that year, he released the song "MudHook" featuring Unearth drummer Nick Pierce.

Personal life 
Scallon's younger brother, John, also played music as a teenager. He left his instruments behind for Rob when leaving for college. Several instruments in Scallon's personal collection are custom made through collaborations with other content creators.

Scallon married his wife Tamara Chambers in November 2020. They have collaborated on various projects, such as a 2012 Good Mythical Morning episode introduction and a 2014 cover of Pharrell's "Happy".

Discography

Studio albums
Summer (2008)
The Ride Home (2009)
The Winter's Months (2011)
Rob Scallon (2012)
Aldine (2014)
The Scene Is Dead (2017)

Extended plays
A Purple Cello EP (2013)
Anchor (2014)
Sunday Uke Group (2018)

Singles
"Master of Puppets" (Banjo cover ft. Leo Moracchioli) (2016)
"Psychosocial" (Banjo cover ft. Leo Moracchioli) (2017)
"Everything Song" (2020)
"Anchor" (ft. Jessica Burdeaux) (2021)
"MudHook" (ft. Nick Pierce) (2021)

Collaborations
"Told Me" (2012) – Gunnarolla (feat. Rob Scallon)
"Six Inches" (2014) – Gunnarolla (feat. Ally Rhodes & Rob Scallon) 
"Tines" (2017) – Andrew Huang & Rob Scallon
"Advice" (2018) – Cal Chuchesta (feat. Rob Scallon)
Nostalgia Critic's The Wall (2019) – Doug Walker

with Gas Mask Catalogue
Blind. Deaf. Mute. (2009)
Promise Land (2010)

with Hank Green and the Perfect Strangers
Incongruent (2014)

with First of October
Ten Hours (2018)
Gourmet Ravioli (2019)
Gotta Record Everything Good (2021)
Chaos (2022)

References

External links

Living people
American heavy metal musicians
American YouTubers
Music YouTubers
1990 births
Musicians from Chicago
21st-century American musicians
21st-century American male musicians
YouTube channels launched in 2007
People from Arlington Heights, Illinois